Lat-Lon is a company that provides Global Positioning System (GPS) tracking and monitoring devices to the transportation industry. They specialize in solar-powered devices that can be installed on both powered and non-powered vehicles to monitor condition and location, among other variables. The main product is called the Solar Tracking Unit (STU), but it was originally called the RailRider.  The product is known for its ability to harness power from the sun and communicate an abundance of data to the internet for interpretation.

Lat-Lon was founded in 1999 by Dave Baker and Steve Tautz. Originally, Lat-Lon was a privately held limited liability company owned by its founders and Tegra Corp of Sioux City, IA.  On June 1, 2014, the company was purchased by BSM Technologies U.S. Holdings, Inc.

In May, 2019, the company was purchased by Geotab of Toronto Canada.

The company resides in Denver, Colorado.

References

Technology companies of the United States
Companies based in Denver
1999 establishments in Colorado
1999 establishments in the United States
Companies established in 1999
Technology companies established in 1999
GPS satellites
2009 mergers and acquisitions